Ubaid Ullah Jan Babat, also known as Babat Lala is a Pashtun politician  who was a Member of the Provincial Assembly of Balochistan, from May 2013 to May 2018 affiliated with Pashtunkhwa Milli Awami Party. He was born in Bori. He belongs to Kakar tribe ( Shabozi - Sub-tribe).

Early life and education
He was born on 5 May 1958 in Loralai.

Political career

He was elected to the Provincial Assembly of Balochistan as a candidate of Pashtunkhwa Milli Awami Party from Constituency PB-16 Loralai-II in 2013 Pakistani general election.

References

Living people
Pashtun people

Balochistan MPAs 2013–2018
1958 births
Pashtunkhwa Milli Awami Party politicians